Cpt, Leigh Evelyn Jaynes (December 18, 1980)  is an American freestyle wrestler and beach wrestler.

She started wrestling at Rancocas Valley Regional High School in Mount Holly, New Jersey, after a coach dared her to try out for the team.   Needing a winter sport, Jaynes accepted the challenge, becoming a HS All-American via USGWA Girl's Folk-Style National Championship in Flint, MI (1999)

Though Leigh Jaynes competed in swimming, track & field, music, and cheerleading...It was wrestling that provided her the way to Missouri Valley College in Marshall, MO.  The summer of her junior year, following a poor semester, Jaynes enlisted in the U.S. Army Reserve February 22, 2002.  She went on to become a 2x All-American for MoVal.  With a 5th Place finish at University Nationals, she qualified for the Olympic Development Program in Colorado Springs, CO.    

2005:  PFC Leigh Jaynes (68W) became 2LT Leigh Jaynes (70B/67A) Medical Service Corp

EDUCATION

Missouri Valley College, MO

1999-2003:  B.S. Exercise Science (Health/Fitness)

2003-2005:  M.A. Management 

ROTC Wentworth Military Academy (Viking Detachment)
 

OLYMPIC TRAINING CENTER

Colorado Springs, CO

November 2005-July 2013:  On-Campus Resident 

Coach:  Terry Steiner

Club Affiliation:  

2005-2008:  New York Athletic Club

2008-2016:  All-Army Sports/US Army World Class Athlete Program 

Leigh Jaynes made 6 consecutive national teams from 2007-2012 before taking a short break, Jaynes returned to the mat, seized a 3rd world team slot in the highly competitive weight class. She won bronze at the 2015 World Wrestling Championships at Women's freestyle 60 kg.  Jaynes won bronze at 2006 World Beach Wrestling Championships. 

Jaynes also competed in the 2007 World Wrestling Championships and the 2012 World Wrestling Championships.

CPT Jaynes is now a veteran of the U.S. Army (February 22, 2002-June 16, 2016) and was formerly married to Olympic wrestler Ben Provisor.

The two divorced December 16, 2016 and share one daughter.  

Current Information:  

Leigh Jaynes is now the Head Women's Wrestling coach at Delaware Valley University, Doylestown, PA.

References 

United World Wrestling Database

American female sport wrestlers
Living people
American sportswomen
People from Mount Holly, New Jersey
Rancocas Valley Regional High School alumni
Sportspeople from Burlington County, New Jersey
World Wrestling Championships medalists
Year of birth missing (living people)
21st-century American women